Bartolomé "Tintín" Márquez López (born 7 January 1962) is a Spanish retired footballer who played as an attacking midfielder, currently the manager of Qatari club Al-Wakrah SC.

His career was closely associated to Espanyol, as both a player and coach.

Playing career
Born in Barcelona, Catalonia, Márquez was nicknamed after the comic book character Tintin for his similar hairstyle. He signed for RCD Español in early 1980, and played exclusively in his native region during his 15-year professional career. After two loans, at UE Sant Andreu and CE Sabadell FC, he was definitely promoted to the first team in the 1982–83 season, making his La Liga debut on 4 September 1982 by coming on as a late substitute in a 1–0 home win against Racing de Santander.

Márquez played six full campaigns with the Pericos, always in the top flight. His best year was 1985–86, when he scored ten goals in 32 matches to help his team to the 11th position, including a hat-trick on 20 April 1986 in a 5–3 home victory over FC Barcelona; he was also part of the squad that reached the final of the 1987–88 UEFA Cup, but took no part in the competition after falling out of favour with manager Javier Clemente.

Márquez signed with UE Figueres in the 1988 off-season, going on to spend five of his six years in the Segunda División and appear in the promotion playoffs in 1992. He retired at the age of 33, after a spell in the Segunda División B with CE Europa.

Coaching career
Márquez began working as a manager in 1997, his first stop being with his last club in the Tercera División. He won the Copa Catalunya in that year, defeating Barcelona in the final.

On 26 May 1998, Márquez returned to Espanyol – the organisation changed its denomination three years later– going on to be in charge of its youth and reserve teams the following six years. He subsequently served as an assistant to the main squad, first under Miguel Ángel Lotina then Ernesto Valverde.

In the summer of 2008, Márquez was appointed at the first team after Valverde left for Olympiacos FC. However, on 30 November, after four consecutive losses, he was relieved of his duties.

In 2012, after roughly six months with Spanish second-tier side CD Castellón, and a spell at the Aspire Academy in Qatar, Márquez signed for K.A.S. Eupen in the Belgian Second Division. On 31 March 2015, he was fired for undisclosed reasons, when the team were in third place.

Márquez was appointed coach of Sint-Truidense V.V. in June 2017 following Ivan Leko's departure for Club Brugge KV, but was dismissed after 53 days – just two games into the new season – over irreconcilable differences.

In early 2018, Márquez returned to Qatar to manage Second Division side Al-Wakrah SC, being beaten to promotion by compatriot José Murcia's Al-Shahania SC in his first season. A year later, his team won the division.

Managerial statistics

References

External links

Espanyol archives 

1962 births
Living people
Spanish footballers
Footballers from Barcelona
Association football midfielders
La Liga players
Segunda División players
Segunda División B players
Tercera División players
RCD Espanyol footballers
UE Sant Andreu footballers
CE Sabadell FC footballers
UE Figueres footballers
CE Europa footballers
Spain under-21 international footballers
Catalonia international footballers
Spanish football managers
La Liga managers
Segunda División managers
Segunda División B managers
Tercera División managers
CE Europa managers
RCD Espanyol B managers
RCD Espanyol managers
CD Castellón managers
Belgian Pro League managers
K.A.S. Eupen managers
Sint-Truidense V.V. managers
Qatar Stars League managers
Al-Wakrah SC managers
Spanish expatriate football managers
Expatriate football managers in Belgium
Expatriate football managers in Qatar
Spanish expatriate sportspeople in Belgium
Spanish expatriate sportspeople in Qatar